The Disappearance of John and Giannina Colonna is an ongoing missing children's case that has baffled international authorities since it took place, in Puerto Rico during 1974. Even as the case took place five decades ago, international agencies such as the Interpol are still involved trying to solve it.

People involved
John Gianot Colonna Aponte (born February 19, 1962) was twelve years old at the time of his disappearance. His sister Giannina  Maria Colonna Aponte (born April 19, 1963) was eleven. The two were close, and they shared friends and enjoyed hanging out with each other.

The Colonna siblings are Puerto Ricans of French descent. Their father, John Colonna Sr., who died in 1982, was a French-American.

Disappearance
On May 5, 1974, the siblings disappeared while on their way to see a friend at a beach. After it was apparent that the children had disappeared, their mom, Noemí Aponte, went and met the person they were supposed to meet at the beach, an adult man, but he said he had not seen the kids that day.

Investigation
Police believed that the siblings were abducted because a man named Thomas Rodriguez, who had moved to Miami, Florida recently after the disappearance, committed suicide but left a note before doing so, alleging that he knew details about the disappearance, including a plan to collect a ransom of $72,000 dollars by the supposed, unidentified kidnapper or kidnappers.

Rodriguez was said to be a businessman. Notably, Rodriguez was a neighbor of the Colonna family when the disappearance took place.

According to information given by Noemí Aponte to Puerto Rican newspaper Primera Hora during 2013, in 2002, the F.B.I. came to her with allegations that they had found a woman who was in the western Puerto Rico city of Mayaguez claiming that she was looking for her mom and that a family member of hers (the woman in Mayaguez) who was in their deathbed had told her that her mother was Puerto Rican, and that the F.B.I. believed her to be Gianinna Colonna. DNA testing was done, according to Aponte, and her husband John's body exhumed, to perform DNA tests on him too. According to information she gave to the press, she was told by the American government agency that the Colonna children were not John Colonna Sr.'s biological children, a claim she vehemently denies as she declared that John Sr. was the love of her life and that she was a virgin when they married. It was also determined that Gianinna Colonna was not in Mayaguez during the time when the woman the FBI thought was her was, supposedly, in the area.

During 2012, Alberto Grajales, who was the Interpol's Puerto Rico director, declared that the Puerto Rican Instituto de Ciencias Forenses (Forensic Sciences Institute) certified that the Colonna children were not John Colonna's children and that there was no reason to offer Noemí Aponte a public apology. He also said that, if Noemí Aponte proceeded, as she had planned, to ask for her children to be declared legally dead, the case would be archived by his agency.

As of 2022, the case remains unsolved.

See also 

 List of Puerto Ricans

References 

1962 births
1963 births
Missing people
People from Trujillo Alto, Puerto Rico
Puerto Rican people of French descent